A list of films produced by the Marathi language film industry based in Maharashtra in the year 1982.

1982 Releases
A list of Marathi films released in 1982.

References

Lists of 1982 films by country or language
 Marathi
1982